Sand Beach (variant name Sandbeach) is an unincorporated community in South Hanover Township, Dauphin County, Pennsylvania, United States, situated in the Harrisburg-Carlisle Metropolitan Statistical Area, in the vicinity of the census-designated place of Hershey. It lies at the point where the smaller Manada Creek joins the Swatara Creek.

It was founded as Manadaville. The village would later take its name after a post office in the area.

Sand Beach Covered Bridge
The Sand Beach Covered Bridge or Church Ford Covered Bridge was a  Burr arch truss covered bridge built in 1853 and again in 1906 that crossed Swatara Creek between Derry Township and South Hanover Township. The bridge, restored by Hershey Enterprises in 1964, burned the night of September 3, 1966.

References

External links 
Sandbeach, PA profile
Historical Pictures Includes the September 1966 fire.
Hershey Historical Society - Sandbeach Covered Bridge

Harrisburg–Carlisle metropolitan statistical area
Unincorporated communities in Dauphin County, Pennsylvania
Unincorporated communities in Pennsylvania